Phradis is a genus of parasitoid wasps belonging to the family Ichneumonidae.

The species of this genus are found in Europe and Southern Africa.

Species:
 Phradis arivienae Khalaim, 2007
 Phradis brachyarthrus Khalaim, 2007

References

Ichneumonidae
Ichneumonidae genera